Static Thought was an American punk rock band formed in 2000 in Richmond, California, United States, by Travis Davant, Eric Urbach, and Charlie Vincent. Static Thought includes Urbach on guitar and vocals, Johaan Hill on bass and vocals, Aaron Younce on guitar and vocals, and Drew Cueva on drums.

Early years
Band members met in Middle School. The band wrote and self-released their first EP "Were Dumb" under this line up. After playing a few shows, Vincent left the band in 2003, and was replaced by Mike Leon. During this period of the band, the band released the EP "Outta Control". Soon after, Vincent rejoined the band on rhythm guitar in 2005. Soon after his venture back into band Vincent decided to leave and was later replaced by Garcia later that year.

Signing to Hellcat
In 2006, Static Thought Signed to Hellcat Records. That Summer they set out on their first tour with Intro5pect (AF Records). Soon after the tour, the band went into the studio and recorded their first full length In The Trenches. Soon after in 2007, Leon left the band and was replaced by Hill. The band continued to tour across the US and Canada. In 2008 The band went into the studio and recorded tracks for a split with Societys Parasites, and their highly acclaimed full length The Motive For Movement. They then headed on extensive touring of Europe, Canada and America. After the extensive touring in 2009, Davant decided to leave the band and was replaced soon after by Drew Cueva.

Later activities
Heading into the new decade the band has begun to work on new songs for a new Full Length album and more touring. In the summer of 2010 A split with wartortle was released on Swamp Cabbage Records. The band headed to the UK for a 10-day tour including a stop at the Reading and Leeds Festivals.

The band quit in 2012.

Albums
2012 Static Thought
2008 The Motive For Movement
2007 In the Trenches

EPs
2011 Soylent Green
2010 Static Thought//Wartortle 7"Split
2008 From The Bay to LA
2005 Outta Control
2004 Were Dumb

Compilations
2006 Track 17 "Victim of Hate" on Give 'Em the Boot V (Hellcat Records)

References

External links
The Official Static Thought Web site
The Static Thought Myspace site
Hellcat Records

Punk rock groups from California
Musical groups from Oakland, California
Hellcat Records artists
Musical groups established in 2000